Gilbert Arthur Whitehouse (October 15, 1893 – February 12, 1926) was a Major League Baseball right fielder who played for two seasons. He played for the Boston Braves in three games during the 1912 Boston Braves season and he played for the Newark Peppers in 35 games during the 1915 season.

External links

1893 births
1926 deaths
Major League Baseball right fielders
Baseball players from Massachusetts
Boston Braves players
Newark Peppers players
People from Brewer, Maine
Worcester Busters players
Portland Duffs players
Hartford Senators players
New London Planters players
Toronto Maple Leafs (International League) players
Jersey City Skeeters players
Sportspeople from Somerville, Massachusetts